Myrmephytum is a genus of myrmecophytic flowering plants in the family Rubiaceae. It is distributed from central Malesia to New Guinea.

It is one of five ant-plant genera in the family Rubiaceae, the others being Anthorrhiza, Hydnophytum, Myrmecodia, and Squamellaria.

Species
The following list of 5 species is sourced from The Plant List.

Myrmephytum arfakianum (Becc.) Huxley & Jebb
Myrmephytum beccarii Elmer
Myrmephytum moniliforme Huxley & Jebb
Myrmephytum naumannii (Warb.) Huxley & Jebb	
Myrmephytum selebicum (Becc.) Becc.

References

Rubiaceae genera
Myrmecophytes
Taxa named by Odoardo Beccari
Psychotrieae